Nervous on the Road is a pub rock album by Brinsley Schwarz, released in 1972.

Track listing 
All tracks composed by Nick Lowe; except where indicated
 "It's Been So Long" (Ian Gomm) – 2:07
 "Happy Doing What We're Doing" (Lowe, Bob Andrews) – 4:43
 "Surrender to the Rhythm"  – 3:25
 "Don't Lose Your Grip On Love"  – 4:24
 "Nervous On The Road (But Can't Stay At Home)"  – 4:58
 "Feel A Little Funky"  – 5:09
 "I Like It Like That" (Chris Kenner, Allen Toussaint) – 3:06
 "Brand New You, Brand New Me"  – 4:39
 "Home In My Hand" (Ronnie Self) – 2:56
 "Why, Why, Why, Why, Why"  – 3:49

Personnel 
Brinsley Schwarz
 Brinsley Schwarz	 - 	guitar, alto and tenor saxophone, vocals
 Ian Gomm	 - 	guitars, vocals
 Billy Rankin	 - 	drums
 Bob Andrews	 - 	keyboards, alto saxophone, vocals
 Nick Lowe	 - 	bass guitar, acoustic guitar, vocals
Technical
Ralph Down, Kingsley "Magic Fingers" Ward - engineers
Jet Power - cover

References 

Brinsley Schwarz albums
1972 albums
United Artists Records albums
Albums recorded at Rockfield Studios